Feng Jing (born 15 January 1985) is a Chinese gymnast. Feng surprisingly won the gold in the men's individual All-around in the 2001 world championships, when China did not send its strongest team to the event. He was also part of the Chinese team that won the gold medal in the team event at the 2006 World Artistic Gymnastics Championships and the 2006 Asian Games.

References

External links
 

Living people
1985 births
Chinese male artistic gymnasts
World champion gymnasts
Medalists at the World Artistic Gymnastics Championships
Place of birth missing (living people)
Sportspeople from Xi'an
Asian Games medalists in gymnastics
Asian Games gold medalists for China
Gymnasts at the 2002 Asian Games
Gymnasts at the 2006 Asian Games
Medalists at the 2002 Asian Games
Medalists at the 2006 Asian Games
Gymnasts from Shaanxi
20th-century Chinese people
21st-century Chinese people